The 1941 NFL season was the 22nd regular season of the National Football League. Before the season, Elmer Layden was named the first Commissioner of the NFL, while Carl Storck resigned as league president. Layden also took on the duties of president and signed a five-year contract at $20,000 annually.

The league bylaws were changed to provide for playoffs in cases where division races are tied after the regular season, and rules for sudden-death overtimes in case a playoff game was tied after four quarters.

The defending league champion Chicago Bears and the Green Bay Packers finished the regular season tied in the Western Division, setting up the first divisional playoff game in league history. The Bears won 33–14 at Wrigley Field on December 14, then defeated the New York Giants 37–9 in the NFL championship game at Wrigley Field on December 21.

The total attendance for the league's 55 regular season games was 1,118,616. This represented an increase of 9% over the previous season's attendance.

Draft
The 1941 NFL Draft was held on December 10, 1940, at Washington, D.C.'s Willard Hotel. With the first pick, the Chicago Bears selected halfback Tom Harmon from The University of Michigan.

Major rule changes
The penalty for illegal shift is 5 yards.
The penalty for illegal kick or bat is 15 yards.
Whenever a player is ejected from the game, his team is penalized 15 yards.
A personal foul committed by the opponent of the scoring team is enforced on the ensuing kickoff.

In addition to these rule changes, this season marked the first time that the league commissioner became involved in enforcement of player conduct standards. Commissioner Elmer Layden in August assessed $25 fines on Green Bay Packers quarterback Larry Craig and New York Giants halfback Hank Soar for fighting.

Wilson became the official game ball of the NFL.

Division races
In the Eastern Division, the Redskins held a half-game after nine weeks of play: at 5–1–0, their only loss had been 17–10 to the 5–2-0 Giants, who had lost two games in a row. 
Washington, however, lost its next three games, while the Giants rebounded to win their next two games.

On November 23, the 5–3 Redskins met the 7–2 Giants at the Polo Grounds, and the Giants' 20–13 win clinched the Division championship.

The Western Division race was one between the Bears and Packers. By November 2, when the teams met at Wrigley Field, the Bears were 5–0 and the Packers 6–1, in part because of the Bears' earlier 25–17 win at Green Bay. Green Bay's 16–14 win put them in the lead, and they finished the regular season at 10–1 on November 30 with a 22–17 comeback win at Washington. 

On the afternoon of December 7, 1941, on the day Japanese planes bombed Pearl Harbor, the Bears were losing to the Cardinals, 14–0, and trailed 24–20 in the fourth quarter before rallying for a 34–24 win. Both teams finished at 10–1 and a playoff was set to determine who would go to, and host, the Championship Game.

With the United States now embroiled in World War II, the Bears and Packers met at Wrigley Field on December 14, with Chicago winning 33–14.

Final standings

Playoffs
Western Division Playoff Game

CHI. BEARS 33, Green Bay 14
NFL Championship Game

CHI. BEARS 37, N.Y. Giants 9

Home team in capitals

League leaders

Awards

Coaching changes
Detroit Lions: George Clark was replaced by Bill Edwards.
Pittsburgh Steelers: Walt Kiesling was replaced by Bert Bell, who had sold his ownership stake in the Eagles and then bought a share of the Steelers. Bell resigned as head coach after losing the first two games. Aldo Donelli did not fare any better, losing the next five before being fired. Kiesling then returned for the final four games.
Philadelphia Eagles: Bert Bell, who left the Eagles to join the Steelers, was replaced by Greasy Neale.

Stadium changes
 The Detroit Lions played full time at Briggs Stadium, no longer holding home games at University of Detroit Stadium
 The Philadelphia Eagles moved back from Shibe Park to the larger Philadelphia Municipal Stadium, where they previously played from 1936 to 1940

References

 NFL Record and Fact Book
 NFL History 1941–1950 (Last accessed December 4, 2005)
 Total Football: The Official Encyclopedia of the National Football League

National Football League seasons